The 2017 World Financial Group Continental Cup of Curling was held from January 12 to 15 at the Orleans Arena in Paradise, Nevada. This marked the third edition of the Continental Cup held outside of Canada. The Continental Cup featured team events, mixed doubles events, and skins competitions, and the brunt of the points was in the skins competitions. TSN broadcast the event, as it had in previous years.

North America would go on to win the event 37 points to 23. The total attendance for the event was 57,753, the second highest in event history.

Competition format
This edition of the Continental Cup used a similar format as that of the previous year, with the main difference being the elimination of the singles event, which was replaced by an additional mixed doubles event. Out of the sixty total points available, a majority of points was needed to win the cup. The mixed doubles, and team games were worth one point each, and ties were worth one half point each to both teams. The skins games were worth a total of five points. Nine mixed doubles were played, along with eighteen team games and six skins games.

Teams
The teams were selected from the top teams in each region. Six teams from each region will compete against each other in the competition. Four teams from Canada earn the right to represent Team North America by virtue of winning certain events, namely the Canada Cup of Curling and the Canadian National Championships (the Brier and the Tournament of Hearts). Two teams from the United States, namely the top point-getters of American teams on the World Curling Tour, were chosen to represent North America, and the teams representing Team World were selected by the World Curling Federation.

The teams in the table below have been announced as representatives of their respective regions.

Events
All times listed are in Pacific Standard Time (UTC−8).

Thursday, January 12

Draw 1
Team
9:00 am

Draw 2
Mixed doubles
1:30 pm

Draw 3
Team
6:30 pm

Friday, January 13

Draw 4
Team
9:00 am

Draw 5
Mixed doubles
1:30 pm

Draw 6
Team
6:30 pm

Saturday, January 14

Draw 7
Mixed doubles
9:00 am

Draw 8
Team
1:30 pm

Draw 9
Team
6:30 pm

Sunday, January 15

Draw 10
Skins
1:30 pm

Draw 11
Skins
6:30 pm

References

External links 

2017
2017 in curling
International curling competitions hosted by the United States
2017 in sports in Nevada
Sports competitions in the Las Vegas Valley
Curling in Nevada
January 2017 sports events in the United States